Ranganatha Temple or Ranganathaswamy Temple can refer to any of several temples dedicated to the Hindu God Ranganatha, including:

Ranganathaswamy Temple, Srirangam, Tiruchirapalli district, Tamil Nadu
Ranganathaswamy Temple, Srirangapatna, Karnataka
Ranganathaswamy Temple, Shivanasamudra, Karnataka
Sri Ranganadha swamy temple, Nanakramguda, Hyderabad, Telangana
Ranganathaswamy Temple, Jiyaguda, Andhra Pradesh
Ranganatha Temple, Nellore, Andhra Pradesh
Ranganatha Temple, Vavilavalasa, Andhra Pradesh
Ranganathaswamy Temple, Karamadai, Tamil Nadu